Whispering to the Shadows is a 2002 EP by the band Envilent, now known as The Funeral Pyre.

Unlike most of their later albums, Whispering to the Shadows had a much more black metal feel to it. Apparently, during a show for one of this album's promotional shows, the owner of the venue stopped the show, because it had become too violent.

This album was only a "bedroom recording" according to John Strachan.

Track listing

Personnel 
Alex Hernandez - drums
Adam Campbell - bass guitar
James Joyce - guitar
Jason Dunn - guitar
John Strachan - vocals

References 

The Funeral Pyre albums
2003 EPs